Seema Malhotra (born 7 August 1972) is a British politician serving as the Member of Parliament (MP) for Feltham and Heston since 2011. A member of Labour and Co-operative, she has served as Shadow Minister for Business and Consumers since 2021 and previously sat on the opposition front bench as the Shadow Chief Secretary to the Treasury, Shadow Minister for Employment and a shadow Home Office minister.

Early career
One of five children of Sushil Kumar Malhotra (1941–2014), of Osterley, a shop owner, formerly a financial adviser and an engineer, and his wife Usha, she was educated at schools in the London Borough of Hounslow, studied politics and philosophy at the University of Warwick and took a postgraduate degree in business and information studies at Aston University.

Of Indian Hindu descent, Malhotra is a former management consultant who worked for Accenture and PriceWaterhouseCoopers. She founded the Fabian Women's Network, and was a previous National Chair of the Young Fabians.

Malhotra was the Labour candidate for the South West constituency in the 2004 London Assembly elections, coming third with 17% of the vote.

While Labour was in government before 2010, she worked as an adviser to Liam Byrne and Ian Austin when they were regional ministers for the West Midlands. Following Gordon Brown's resignation as Labour leader in the wake of the 2010 general election, she was the special adviser to Harriet Harman during her tenure as Leader of the Labour Party.

Parliamentary career 
Malholtra entered Parliament in December 2011, on majority of 6,203 in the Feltham and Heston by-election, which increased in 2015 and in 2017, to reach 15,603 votes.

In August 2014, Ed Miliband appointed Malhotra to the newly created role of Shadow Minister for Preventing Violence Against Women and Girls. The role earmarked Malhotra to be among Labour's Home Office ministers if the party became elected to power. In this she took up identifying problems, finding solutions and reviewing funding decisions as to crime prevention, prosecution and victim support in cases of rape, sexual assault, domestic violence, female genital mutilation, forced marriage, prostitution and trafficking.

On 13 September 2015, Malhotra was appointed Shadow Chief Secretary to the Treasury in Jeremy Corbyn's shadow cabinet. On 26 June 2016, Malhotra resigned from the shadow cabinet over the leadership, along with dozens of other shadow ministers. She supported Owen Smith in his failed bid to replace Corbyn in the 2016 Labour Party (UK) leadership election.

Following her resignation, Malhotra formally complained to the Speaker of the House of Commons about aides to Corbyn and McDonnell gaining unauthorised access to her office after her resignation and "harassment" of her staff. John McDonnell's explanation was that the office was a shadow Treasury team office which Malhotra was moving out of, and his office manager who was a key holder, after seeing boxes outside, went in to check if it was now empty. After an investigation, the Speaker concluded there was no information which justified regarding the events as a possible breach of Parliamentary privilege.

Malhotra voted in the successful yes ('Aye') lobby in a key House of Commons division of 25 June 2018 as to the National Policy Statement: Airports which laid out government support for a third runway, and was not among the 28 of 46 London Labour MPs opposing the runway. During the related debate she said:
"A majority in my constituency is in favour of expansion — every poll in recent years has shown that, and it is generally in the ballpark of 2:1. Tens of thousands of my constituents work, or have worked, at the airport. London’s first airport was in my constituency, in what is now Hanworth Air Park...

Today it is a disgrace that we are unfortunately being asked to vote before we have all the information, including sight of new flight paths and analysis of how people will be affected. If the Government get support for the NPS tonight, it will be for them to hold true to their word that the development consent will not be given unless detailed proposals show how environmental impacts will be mitigated in line with legal obligations, and all other commitments adhered to."Following Keir Starmer's election as Labour leader in April 2020, Malhotra returned to the front bench as the Shadow Minister for Employment in the shadow work and pensions team. She was appointed as the Shadow Minister for Business and Consumers in the minor May 2021 reshuffle, succeeding Lucy Powell in the role.

Personal life 
Malhotra is married to management consultant and financier Sushil Kumar Saluja, who was Accenture’s Senior Managing Director for Financial Services in Europe, Africa, Middle East, and Latin America, and serves on the board of TheCityUK which is an industry body that promotes financial services in the UK. They live in Chelsea, London. Prior to serving as an MP, it was reported that Malhotra used the name 'Malhotra-Suma'; the 2017 Election poll results state her name to be 'Seema Malhotra-Saluja (known as Seema Malhotra)'.

References

External links 
Her website

|-

|-

|-

|-

1972 births
Living people
Alumni of the University of Warwick
Alumni of Aston University
British politicians of Indian descent
Labour Co-operative MPs for English constituencies
Female members of the Parliament of the United Kingdom for English constituencies
People from Feltham
UK MPs 2010–2015
UK MPs 2015–2017
UK MPs 2017–2019
UK MPs 2019–present
21st-century British women politicians
Chairs of the Fabian Society
21st-century English women
21st-century English people